Otto Eberhard Rössler (born 20 May 1940) is a German biochemist known for his work on chaos theory and the theoretical equation known as the Rössler attractor. He is best known to the general public for his involvement in a failed lawsuit to halt the Large Hadron Collider due to fears that it would generate mini black holes.

Biography
Rössler was born in Berlin, into an academic family: his father, also named Otto Rössler, was an Austrian Nazi and a scholar of Semitic languages who was affiliated with the Ahnenerbe and later held a professorship at the University of Marburg.

Rössler was awarded his MD in 1966. After postdoctoral studies at the Max Planck Institute for Behavioral Physiology in Bavaria, and a visiting appointment at the Center for Theoretical Biology at SUNY-Buffalo, in 1969 he became Professor for Theoretical Biochemistry at the University of Tübingen. In 1994, he became Professor of Chemistry by decree.

Rössler has held visiting positions at the University of Guelph (Mathematics) in Canada, the Center for Nonlinear Studies of the University of California at Los Alamos, the University of Virginia (Chemical Engineering), the Technical University of Denmark (Theoretical Physics), and the Santa Fe Institute (Complexity Research) in New Mexico.

Research
Rössler has authored hundreds of scientific papers in fields as wide-ranging as biogenesis, the origin of language, differentiable automata, chaotic attractors, endophysics, micro relativity, artificial universes, the hypertext encyclopedia, and world-changing technology.

His most heavily cited publication is the 1976 paper in which he studied what is now known as the Rössler attractor, a system of three linked differential equations that exhibit chaotic dynamics. In 2015, Rössler published in Progress in Biophysics and Molecular Biology "a journal article that points not only to a potential cure for autism, but also a means of creating mystical, all-wise elephants".

Advocacy
Rössler and his wife Reimara have been involved with a long-running series of disputes with their employer, the University of Tübingen, which they accuse of discrimination and of violations of academic freedom. In 1988, Reimara Rössler, a professor of medicine, was transferred to a different department within the university; in protest, she began working from home. The state of Baden-Württemberg sued her for failure to perform her assigned duties, as a result of which by 1996 she lost her job and was forced to give up a second home to refund her back pay. Meanwhile, in 1993 and 1994, Otto Rössler had been assigned to teach an introductory chemistry course according to the prescribed curriculum for medical students, but insisted instead on teaching his own material. After he was replaced in the course by another lecturer, he continued trying to give the lectures himself, and was removed by police several times. Because of these incidents, in 1995 a state official tried to force Rössler to undergo psychological tests, but after international protests by many academics this plan was dropped. Rössler continued protesting against his and his wife's treatment by the university and in August 2001 he was caught defacing the university auditorium with spray paint in an attempt to draw attention to his protests.

In June 2008, Rössler publicly criticized the Large Hadron Collider experiment supervised by CERN in Geneva and was involved in a failed lawsuit to halt it. He argued that the experiment could plausibly generate dangerous miniature black holes that could bring about the end of the world. Hermann Nicolai, director of the Max Planck Institute for Gravitational Physics' quantum gravity division, later described Rössler's arguments as being "... based on an elementary misunderstanding of the theory of general relativity".

Rössler has also been an honorary editor of the journal Chaos, Solitons & Fractals, which came under fire in 2009 for allegedly publishing papers without as strict peer review as would be expected for a scientific journal. In a subsequent libel suit brought by former journal editor Mohammed El Naschie in response to this criticism, Rössler testified on behalf of El Naschie, stating in court about peer review that "if you have something new to offer, peer review is dangerous", adding that in such cases "peer review delays progress in science".

Books
Rössler is the author or co-author of:
 Encounter with Chaos: Self-Organized Hierarchical Complexity in Semiconductor Experiments (with J. Peinke, J. Parisi, and R. Stoop 1992, Springer-Verlag, 1992)
 Das Flammenschwert oder wie hermetisch ist die Schnittstelle des Mikrokonstruktivismus? (in German, Benteli, 1996)
 Interventionen. Vertikale und horizontale Grenzüberschreitung (in German, with René Stettler, Stroemfeld, 1997)
 Aussenwelt – Innenwelt – Überwelt. Ein Gespräch (in German, with René Stettler and Peter Weibel, Stroemfeld, 1997)
 Endophysics: The World As An Interface (World Scientific, 1998)
 Das Denken eines Kindes: Entwicklung, Persönlichkeit, Gefühle (in German, with R. Rössler, Rowohlt, 1998)
 Medium des Wissens. Das Menschenrecht auf Information (in German, with Artur P. Schmidt, P. Haupt, 2000)
 Descartes' Traum : von der unendlichen Macht des Außenstehens (Audiobook, in German, Supposé, 2002)
 Chaos: The world of nonperiodic oscillations (Springer, 2020) Chaos

References

External links

 Otto Rössler. Institut für Physikalische und Theoretische Chemie, Universität Tübingen.
 Otto Rössler: From the origin of life to the architecture of chaos. (20 October 2004). Analyse Topologique et Modélisation de Systèmes Dynamiques.

1940 births
Living people
Chaos theorists
German biochemists
Academic staff of the University of Tübingen
Academic controversies
Scientists from Berlin